Mulund College of Commerce, popularly known by the acronym MCC, is a college established and managed by Parle Tilak Vidyalay Association. The college is situated on the north-eastern boundary of Mumbai, in a suburb called Mulund. 

The college was founded in 1970 and counts Shri Babasaheb Pethe and Shri Baburao Paranjpe among its founders. The junior college wing was started in 1976. In the last five decades the college has developed from being a commerce college to one which offer higher education in multiple disciplines including science, management and media studies. The college offers 5 PG courses and has a research center in the subject of Business Economics. 

The college has been granted autonomous status in the year 2021. The college was awarded "Best College" status by University of Mumbai, in urban category, in the year 2012–13. It has been ranked A grade in all its three cycles of NAAC accreditation. The college is known for its distinguished alumni and has been one of the most preferred colleges among CA aspirants. 

The National Service Scheme unit of the college has been adjudged as the best NSS unit in urban category by University of Mumbai in the year 2018–19. The Theatre, cultural and sports wing of the college are also renowned for their work. Among the higher education institutes of Mumbai, the college stands out for its economical and quality education.

References

harshad 
 Official website

Commerce colleges in India
Universities and colleges in Mumbai
Educational institutions established in 1970
1970 establishments in Maharashtra